Janq'u Willk'i (Aymara jach'a big, qullu mountain, "big mountain", also spelled Jankho Willkhi) is a mountain in the Andes of Bolivia which reaches a height of approximately  . It is located in the Oruro Department, Sajama Province, Turco Municipality. Janq'u Willk'i lies southwest of Ch'iyar Jaqhi.

References 

Mountains of Oruro Department